Practical Joke  is a 1977 romantic drama directed Vladimir Menshov. The film was his feature directorial debut.

Plot 
The action takes place in an ordinary Soviet school.

Life poses upperclassmen first adult issues. Bidding farewell to childhood, they begin a new attitude to friendship and love, talent and rivalry. They must decide themselves which way to go for their dreams.

Cast
 Dmitry Kharatyan as Igor Grushko, a pupil of 9th class
 Yevgeniya Khanayeva as Maria Vasilievna Devyatova, the class teacher and a teacher of mathematics
 Natalya Vavilova as Taya Petrova, a student
 Andrey Gusev as Oleg Komarovsky, a student
 Zinovy Gerdt as Karl Sigismundovich Yolikov, Chemistry teacher
 Oleg Tabakov as father Komarovsky
 Evdokiya Germanova as Dasha
 Natalya Fateyeva as head teacher
 Garri Bardin as   French teacher
 Irina Murzaeva as neighbor Fira Solomonovna
 Vladimir Menshov as physical education teacher Vladimir Valentinovich

Remake
In 2008, a remake was made in this film in which Dmitry Kharatyan played the role of Oleg Komarovsky's father (in the new film — Komarov), and Evdokiya Germanova as  Taya Petrova's mother.

References

External links
 

1977 films
1977 romantic drama films
Soviet romantic drama films
Russian romantic drama films
Films directed by Vladimir Menshov
Russian teen drama films
Mosfilm films
Films set in schools
1977 directorial debut films
Soviet teen drama films